Classical guitar pedagogy is a collection of ideas, structures and patterns that are commonly used in teaching guitar. These standards include a variety of techniques and songs that incorporate these techniques to develop a player's abilities.

Classical guitar pedagogy

The classical guitar pedagogy is a collection of ideas, structures and patterns that are typical in teaching the instrument. These elements have been formalised by several music governing bodies, most notably ABRSM. These frameworks contain a rubric to teach classical guitar from novice to expert. The pedagogy includes physical techniques and a wide array of songs that encompass these techniques as well as developing breadth in the styles of classical guitar. Music theory is also taught throughout the pedagogy, as the teaching of classical guitar utilises many aspects of the general musical education.

Classical guitar education
The classical guitar is today a standard instrument that can be studied at music universities and conservatories. Numerous education publications are available, from guitar-related books, to musical style, etc.

There are also institutions that offer worldwide graded music exams. Examples include: 
ABRSM: graded music exams from Grade 1 to Grade 8, or advanced diplomas
Trinity College London: graded music exams from Grade 1 to Grade 8, Music Certificate Exams, or advanced diplomas
etc.
Articles which consider graded exams in the context of the classical guitar have been written by the EGTA (European Guitar Teachers Association).

Music Pedagogy
Classical guitar pedagogy also includes music pedagogy. Relevant publications from John Sloboda and others exist, which consider e.g. 
Psychology of Music 
Philosophy of Music 
Music Education
etc.
Students studying music pedagogy usually receive access (via their learning institution e.g. university) to searchable online journals (e.g. via JSTOR, ProQuest) which simplifies the process of locating relevant data, studies and citations for their own research.

Classical guitar technique

Brad Conroy's lesson on simple right hand arppegios

Bibliography
Bibliography at the end of the article

References

External links

EGTA (European Guitar Teachers Association)
EGTA - European Guitar Teachers Association (UK)
The EGTA Series: realising new aims in educational guitar music by Richard Wright (1996)
The EGTA Series
A Common Approach: National Curriculum (see also: 1)
A Common Approach - An instrumental/vocal curriculum

Articles
The Role of 'Expressive Doing' in Education by Ricardo Iznaola (EGTA, 2000)
Unleashing Talent by Ricardo Iznaola (EGTA, 1994)
Making Music: Is Musical Ability a 'gift'...or... by Ricardo Iznaola (Presentation for the DU Alumni Symposium, October 3, 2009)

Spanish classical guitar